The Women's 25 metre air pistol event at the 2013 Southeast Asian Games took place on 16–17 December 2013 at the North Dagon Shooting Range in Yangon, Myanmar.

The event consisted of three rounds: a qualifier, a semifinal and a final. In the qualifier, each shooter fired 60 shots with a pistol at 25 metres distance. Scores for each shot were in increments of 1, with a maximum score of 10. The first 30 shots were in the precision stage, with series of 5 shots being shot within 5 minutes. The second set of 30 shots gave shooters 3 seconds to take each shot.

The top 8 shooters in the qualifying round advanced on to the semifinal round. After semifinal the highest two rank shooters advanced to the Final round and the 3rd and 4th rank competed in medal bronze round.

Schedule
All times are Myanmar Standard Time (UTC+06:30)

Qualification round

Final
Legend
QG — Qualified for Gold Medal 
QB — Qualified for Bronze Medal
SO — Athlete eliminated by Shoot-off for tie

1st Competition Stage - Semifinal

2nd Competition Stage - Medal Matches

References

Shooting at the 2013 Southeast Asian Games
South